ETX Studio, formerly known as Relaxnews is a French public relations firm which provides advertorial content to news providers.

History

Relaxnews was founded in Paris in 1998 by Pierre Doncieux, former editor-in-chief and associate editor of Vogue for men, Lui and VSD. Jérôme Doncieux, former Executive Director of Euro RSCG France and Director of the Association of Agencies-advice in Communication ( AACC), joined his brother in the business in 2000.

Member of the French Federation of News Agencies, Relaxnews is the first French news agency to be dedicated to leisure news. The company has specialized in this field to meet the high demand for lifestyle and leisure news. According to a survey conducted by the Opinion Way Institute in May 2006, 79% of the French population is interested in news about leisure.

, The company has received the RIAM Label which rewards innovative multimedia and audiovisual projects. Relaxnews’ project  “Relaxmultimedia”, has been realized  with the contribution of the international news agency AFP (Agence France Presse) and the University of la Rochelle.

Products

 The "relaxwire"
Launched in 2006, the « relaxwire » is the first newswire about leisure news. It covers four leisure categories: well-being, home, entertainment and tourism.

 The "relax adhoc"

The division focuses on editorial content (concepts, texts, pictures) as well as the production of customized pages, articles, dossiers, supplements and special issues. All the content is available for print, web or mobile use.

Notes

External links
  Relaxnews official website

News agencies based in France